Dilliram Sharma Acharya (born April 4, 1960) is a poet of the Nepali language from Bhutanese diaspora. He currently lives in  Norway. He started writing during his life as a refugee after he was exiled from Bhutan.

Biography
Acharya was born in Sarbang (now Sarpang), Bhutan. He is the first son of Naina Kala Acharya and her husband Dhruba Lal Acharya. He was born after his father had married his step-mother Naina Kala Acharya. He got his early education while he was in Bhutan. In 1990, he was alleged by the Government of Bhutan of being involved in the Bhutanese Democratic revolution. The government publicly issued an arrest warrant. So, in order to escape arrest, he left Bhutan. He spent two years in Assam and Bengal with other Bhutanese refugees in exile. Later, in 1991, he came to Nepal. He then lived in a refugee camp in Jhapa Nepal.

Education and work

In 1995, he started the class offered by Nepali Bhasa Parisad Bhutan. He was glad to get further education and started spending a lot of time on his course. He worked hard and put his effort to education as much as provided by the organization. He passed B.A. in Nepali literature. In 1996, he was appointed as a Nepali teacher in Marigold Academy School in Beldangi II extension. He did social work in Camp management committee. Acharya spent refugee life in camp for eighteen years and contributed number of literary books in Nepali. He is the first person to begin Epics writing in Bhutanese diaspora.

After the refugee resettlement process, he is residing in Norway now. He is still contributing books and creative knowledge to Bhutanese literature. He has three sons, two daughters and seven grandkids.

Publications

He has written and published books listed below.

1.Epics (Mahakavya)
Homeland Epic (2001) “Matri Bhumi Mahakavya”,

2.Radha Epic (2004) “Radha Mahakavya”

3.Spring Epic (2004) “Basanta Mahakavya”

4.Miss Epic (2007) “Kumari Mahakavya”

5.Elegy (Khandakavya)
Lightning lyrical elegy (2001) “Chatyang Khandakavya”

6.Sarita elegy (2002) “Sarita Khandakavya”

7.Stories/Novels/ Essays
Description of Bhutanese Movement (poetry collection)

8.Domestic Violence and Ways to control it (2007)

9. The days after the deprivation of country (2006)

10.Collection of Political articles (2008)

Awards and honours

He was honored  by Literature council of Bhutan at Cincinnati Ohio on June 10, 2018.
He was awarded by Sahitya Alankar Guthi Khudunabari Jhapa Nepal
He was also awarded by Bhutanese management committee in 2005 Belgadi Jhapa Nepal.

References
http://bhutaneseliterature.com/archives/14562

External links
 https://www.youtube.com/watch?v=kGX3gpOg9tQ
 https://www.facebook.com/dilliram.acharya.7

1960 births
Bhutanese poets
Living people
People from Sarpang District
Bhutanese people of Nepalese descent
Nepali-language poets
21st-century poets
Khas people